The Hallstatt Museum is a museum in Hallstatt, Upper Austria, that has an unrivalled collection of discoveries from the local salt mines and from the cemeteries of Iron Age date near to the mines, which have made Hallstatt the type site for the important Hallstatt culture. The museum is close to the Hallstättersee, below the salt mines on the mountainside. The museum, the salt mines, and the Dachstein Ice Cave are designated as an UNESCO World Heritage Site.

Since 2002 the museum has occupied the former Hallstatt parsonage, and the previous holdings of the museum have been reunited with many of the objects which had previously been on display at the Naturhistorisches Museum in Vienna.

History

The earliest discoveries were made in 1846 by Johann Georg Ramsauer, who was the Bergmeister or Official of the Habsburg Salt Mines. He started a series of meticulous excavations on the cemeteries around the mines between 1846 and 1867. He was helped with this by a mining assistant, Isodor Engl. Then from 1871 to 1878, Engl continued the excavations on behalf of the Museum Francisco-Carolinum in Linz. Many of these earlier finds became part of the collections in Linz Museum. In 1884 the Hallstatt Museum Association started to form a museum collection.  In 1889, the Anthropological Society of Vienna and the Vienna Naturhistorisches Museum joined with the Hallstatt museum to undertake further excavation. The excavator was Bergrat Hutter, and he was assisted by Isodor Engl. This led to many of the most important discoveries being placed on display in Vienna. In 1895 Engl became the curator of the Hallstatt museum. 
In 1907 new excavations were started by Marie, Duchess of Mecklenburg - Schwerin,  who had the support of Kaiser Franz Joseph and Kaiser Wilhelm (on behalf of the Berlin Museum)), who excavated 40 graves. She was a leading figure in Iron Ages studies and conducted many excavations. However, after the 1st World War, her collection was confiscated by the Serbian Government. In 1934 the collection was sold in the United States and the finds from Hallstatt were acquired by the Peabody Museum, in Cambridge, Massachusetts.
  
Isodor Engl was followed as the museum's curator by Frederick Morton in 1925. In 1927 Morton and Adolf Mahr began a new series of excavations, both in the mines and above ground. Their excavations were at first on the ‘Grünerwerk’  area of Bronze Age Salt Mining. This was followed in 1937–1939 by excavations in the ‘Damweise’ and the  North Western part of the cemetery. This produced a further 61 burials dating to the period 600-350BC.

After the 2nd World War the collections were reorganized by Franz Zahler and Karl Höplinger. In 1969 the Museum was renamed the ‘Praehistorisches Museum’. During this period, study of collections proceeded jointly with the Vienna Naturhistorisches Museum. In particular the work of  In 2002 the “Museum Hallstatt” was re-opened in the present premises and many of the discoveries brought back from Vienna. 
Since 2002 the Naturhistorisches Museum has established a branch study centre ‘Die montanarchäologischen Forschungen’ in the ‘Bergschmiede‘ and undertakes further research and excavations. In 2010 and important further group of burials was uncovered and in 2013 a wooden staircase from the ‘Christian von Tuschwerk’,  has been moved to a show area within the mine and dated by dendrochronology to the Bronze Age :1344 -1343 BCE.

Ramsauer's Protokoll
In the period 1846–1863 Ramsauer started, at the suggestion of the Museum Francisco-Carolium, a record of his discoveries. The quality of his records were well in advance of contemporary archaeological recording. These records are known as the ‘Protokoll’ and are now held in the Naturhistorisches Museum. The watercolour drawings of the burials were largely undertaken by his assistant Isodor Engl. About 980 burials are recorded as well as about 19,497 grave goods. Slightly over half of these burials are inhumations and the remainder are cremations. In 1859, Ramsauer approached the Kaiser Franz Joseph I, in the hope that these records could be published, but this was declined, presumably because of the considerable cost of colour printing.

Finds from the salt mines
Salt mining in the Hallstatt region commenced in the late Neolithic, and on display in the museum are late Neolithic stone axes and shaft-hole axe-hammers, probably of the Bronze Age.

Finds from the burials

Swords, axes and weapons

Bronze buckets, situla, and bowls

Pottery

Brooches and personal ornaments

Roman remains
Museum Hallstatt also has an extensive collection of Roman artefacts. These suggests that during the Roman period salt mining was recommenced on a considerable scale and monumental stone buildings were constructed. An impressive stone pediment is on display in the museum. In 1987, extensive remains of a stone building were found when the Janu Sports Store was built, and these are available for public view. The Roman finds include several fine Samian ware bowls.

See also
Celts
Keltenmuseum, Hallein
Hochdorf Chieftain's Grave
Heuneburg
Glauberg
Oppidum of Manching
Oppidum
Vix and Mont Lassois

References

Further reading
Fritz Eckart Barth, "The Hallstatt Salt Mines", in  V. Kruta, et al., ed., The Celts (London: Thames & Hudson, 1991), pp. 167–173.
Hodson, F.R. (1990). Hallstatt: The Ramsauer Graves. .
Peter S. Wells: "The Emergence of an Iron Age Economy. The Mecklenburg Grave Groups from Hallstatt and Stična", (The Mecklenburg Collection. Vol. 3, American School of Prehistoric Research. Bulletin. Vol. 33). Peabody Museum, Cambridge MA 1981, .

External links

Museum Hallstatt website

Museums in Upper Austria
Iron Age Austria